Adnan Al Awamleh, started his career with Jordan TV in 1968. After pursuing higher education at Beirut Arab University and BBC Institute, he rejoined Jordan TV as a director, working on several documentaries.

He established Arab Telemedia Group in 1983.

In 2008, Awamleh was awarded the first ever International Emmy Award for best telenovela for the dramatic series Al-Igtiyah (The Invasion).

He stepped down from running the company in 2000 and handed the leadership to his son Talal Al Awamleh.

References 

Jordanian television producers
Living people
Year of birth missing (living people)
People from Amman